Deanery Garden (or The Deanery) is an Arts and Crafts style house and garden in Sonning, Berkshire, England. The house was designed and built by architect Edwin Lutyens between 1899 and 1901. It is a Grade I listed building. The gardens—laid out by Lutyens and planted by garden designer Gertrude Jekyll—are Grade II* listed in the National Register of Historic Parks and Gardens.

Design and construction
The house was built for the founder of the early lifestyle magazine Country Life, Edward Hudson, essentially as a show home. It was featured in the magazine. The house has subsequently been considerably extended on its north side. The garden (c. 1 hectare) was planted by Gertrude Jekyll. Although in the centre of the village next to St Andrew's Church and the Bull Inn, the house and garden are very secluded, being surrounded by high walls. However, the garden can be viewed from the church tower.

Owners
Deanery Garden was owned by Nigel Broackes (from the early 1970s) and Stanley Seeger during the 1980s. Marian Thompson helped to restore the garden.
The house and gardens, which are now owned by Jimmy Page, guitarist with the group Led Zeppelin, are not open to the public.

References

Further reading
 Angel Perkins, The Book of Sonning, Barracuda Books, 1977. . 2nd edition, Baron Buckingham, 1999. . Pages 129–30, 133–5.

External links

Houses completed in 1901
Grade I listed buildings in Berkshire
Grade II* listed parks and gardens in Berkshire
Grade I listed houses
Country houses in Berkshire
Gardens in Berkshire
Gardens by Gertrude Jekyll
Works of Edwin Lutyens in England
Sonning
Arts and Crafts architecture in England